Saltville Battlefields Historic District is a historic American Civil War battlefield and national historic district located around Saltville, in Smyth County and Washington County, Virginia. The district includes 3 contributing buildings, 31 contributing sites, 4 contributing structures, and 1 contributing object near Saltville. It encompass the core areas of two battles, fought on October 2 and December 20, 1864, known as the Battle of Saltville I and Battle of Saltville II, where Confederate and Union forces contested control of the South's most important salt production facilities.  Notable resources include the sites of salt furnaces, Well Fields, Fort Statham, Lover's Leap Defenses, Saltville Gap Overlooks, Mill Cliff gun emplacements, Fort Breckinridge, Fort Hatton, Sanders’ House/Williams Site Battlefield/field hospital, William A. Stuart House, and the Elizabeth Cemetery.

It was listed on the National Register of Historic Places in 2010.

References

Archaeological sites on the National Register of Historic Places in Virginia
Conflict sites on the National Register of Historic Places in Virginia
Historic districts in Smyth County, Virginia
Historic districts on the National Register of Historic Places in Virginia
National Register of Historic Places in Smyth County, Virginia
Victorian architecture in Virginia
Virginia in the American Civil War